Maple Creek is a subterranean meteorite crater in Saskatchewan, Canada. The crater is buried beneath younger sediments and cannot be seen at the surface.

References

Further reading 
 Gent, M. R., Kreis, L. K. and D. Gendzwill., The Maple Creek structure, southwestern Saskatchewan. Summary of Investigations 1992, Saskatchewan Geological Survey, Rep. 92–4, p 204–208. 1992
 Gent, M. R., Maple Creek, Gravity Data, Palynology Report, 1992
 Grieve, R. A. F., Kreis, K., Therriault,A.M.and P.B.Robertson., Impact structures in the Williston Basin. Meteoritics and Planetary Science, v 33, n 4, p A63-A64. 1998
 Vreeken, W. J., Postglacial geomorphic evolution of the Maple Creek Basin, Pallister Triangle, Saskatchewan, Canada, 1998 GSA Annual Meeting, Abstract 50594. 1998

External links 
 Aerial exploration of the Maple Creek crater

Impact craters of Saskatchewan
Cretaceous impact craters
Piapot No. 110, Saskatchewan
Division No. 4, Saskatchewan